The Wien bridge is a type of bridge circuit that was developed by Max Wien in 1891. The bridge consists of four resistors and two capacitors.

At the time of the Wien bridge's invention, bridge circuits were a common way of measuring component values by comparing them to known values. Often an unknown component would be put in one arm of a bridge, and then the bridge would be nulled by adjusting the other arms or changing the frequency of the voltage source. See, for example, the Wheatstone bridge.

The Wien bridge is one of many common bridges. Wien's bridge is used for precision measurement of capacitance in terms of resistance and frequency. It was also used to measure audio frequencies.

The Wien bridge does not require equal values of R or C. At some frequency, the reactance of the series R2–C2 arm will be an exact multiple of the shunt Rx–Cx arm. If the two R3 and R4 arms are adjusted to the same ratio, then the bridge is balanced.

The bridge is balanced when:
 and 

The equations simplify if one chooses R2 = Rx and C2 = Cx; the result is R4 = 2R3.

In practice, the values of R and C will never be exactly equal, but the equations above show that for fixed values in the 2 and x arms, the bridge will balance at some ω and some ratio of R4/R3.

See also
Total harmonic distortion analyzer
Wien bridge oscillator

References

External links
https://web.archive.org/web/20120223142737/http://www.ecelab.com/wien-bridge.htm

Bridge circuits
Impedance measurements

pl:Mostek (elektronika)#Mostek Wiena